The 1976–77 season was the 75th season in which Dundee competed at a Scottish national level, playing in the second tier for the first time since the 1946–47 season. The club would fail to achieve promotion, finishing in 3rd place. Dundee would also compete in both the Scottish League Cup and the Scottish Cup, where they would be eliminated in the group stage of the League Cup, and would reach the semi-finals of the Scottish Cup before being defeated by Celtic.

For the first time in their history, Dundee's kit would be made by an official manufacturer, namely Admiral, who brought their unique look to Dens Park with their curved stripes.

Scottish First Division 

Statistics provided by Dee Archive.

League table

Scottish League Cup 

Statistics provided by Dee Archive.

Group 1

Group 1 table

Scottish Cup 

Statistics provided by Dee Archive.

Player statistics 
Statistics provided by Dee Archive

|}

See also 

 List of Dundee F.C. seasons

References

External links 

 1976-77 Dundee season on Fitbastats

Dundee F.C. seasons
Dundee